The following candidates have announced their intention to run in the 2010 Cook Islands general election.

Akaoa

Amuri-Ureia

Arutanga-Reureu-Nikaupara

Avatiu-Ruatonga-Palmerston

Ivirua

Manihiki

Matavera

Mauke

Mitiaro

Murienua

Ngatangiia

Nikao-Panama

Oneroa

Penrhyn

Pukapuka-Nassau

Rakahanga

Ruaau

Tamarua

Teenui-Mapumai

Tengatangi-Areora-Ngatiarua

Tupapa-Maraerenga

Takuvaine-Tutakimoa

Titikaveka

Vaipae-Tautu

References

Elections in the Cook Islands
2010 elections in Oceania